John Callahan's Pelswick (or simply Pelswick) is an animated television series co-produced by Nelvana Enterprises, Inc. and Suzhou Hong Ying Animation Corporation Limited. The series is about the title character, who uses a wheelchair, emphasizing that he lived a normal life. It was based on the books created by John Callahan. Making a show suitable for children required toning down Callahan's dark humor somewhat, and the show was positive and life-affirming For this, the show was very groundbreaking at the time.

Characters
Pelswick Eggert (voiced by Robert Tinkler) – A 13-year-old boy who uses a wheelchair. How he became a paraplegic is not revealed in the series, but the series' creators imply through commentary that it was due to a car accident. He dislikes it when people treat him differently because of his disability. He dislikes following the crowd and he goes by his own rules.
Ace Nakamura (voiced by Phil Guerrero) – Pelswick's best friend. Ace is technologically smarter than any of his friends, and is often the thinker of the situation.
Goon Gunderson (voiced by Peter Oldring) – Pelswick's other best friend. Huge and slow-witted in his actions and thoughts, Goon is generally good-hearted but rather dangerous when angry. He does not know that wrestling is staged.
Julie Smockford (voiced by Julie Lemieux) – A pretty girl and Pelswick's love interest. She hates all the cliques and popularity contests at school and seems to care mostly about her popularity and image. Julie is smart, dramatic, sometimes annoying, but cares a lot about Pelswick. Pelswick has a crush on her but she is completely oblivious about it. Julie believes in justice for all.
Sandra Scoddle (voiced by Kim Kuhteubl) – Julie's snooty and arrogant best friend/rival and one of Pelswick's friends. She thinks she is better than everyone else and often disputes with Julie. She thinks she is cool, but she's not. She gets caught into the latest trends.
Mr. Jimmy (voiced by David Arquette) – Pelswick's guardian angel who often gives him advice that confuses him until the last moment, no matter what it is. Pelswick cannot stand him and his issues. He is also the comic relief of the show.
Kate Eggert (voiced by Tracey Moore) – Pelswick's precocious younger sister. She treats her reputation as a little sister like a business and usually blackmails Pelswick when butting into his business. She has dreams of owning a big corporation. She is 10 years old.
 Bobby Eggert – Pelswick's and Kate's baby brother. He rarely talks and admires Pelswick. Given that Pelswick and Kate's mother is unseen, it can be assumed Bobby is either adopted or is the child of a relative that their father is taking care of.
 Quentin Eggert (voiced by Tony Rosato) – Pelswick, Kate and Bobby's politically correct father who works as a college professor until he is fired in "The Case of the Filched Files." He later gets his job back. He wants to do everything by papers. His wife was killed in the same car accident that made Pelswick into a paraplegic.
 Priscilla "Gram-Gram" Eggert (voiced by Ellen Ray Hennessy) – Quentin's mother and Pelswick, Kate and Bobby's deranged grandmother. She often does "extreme" acts beyond that of a grandmother. Most of these acts results in her getting arrested.
 Boyd Scullarzo (voiced by Chuck Campbell) – The bully of Pelswick's school who likes bullying Pelswick and others, not physically but with humiliation.
 Vice Principal Ziegler (voiced by David Huband) – The vice principal of Jr High (Pelswick's school). Despite his title, he usually assumes the role of a principal. Throughout the show, there is no mention of there being a principal at Jr High. During the second episode of the series, this issue was lampshaded by Goon Gunderson who questioned why their school had a vice principal but no principal.

Episodes

Season 1 (2000–01)

Season 2 (2001–02)

Broadcast
The show aired in reruns on CBS during the Nick on CBS block from September 14 to November 23, 2002, and on Nicktoons from May 2002 to September 2005. The show reran on Adult Swim in Canada between early 2021 and mid-2022.

References

External links
 Pelswick on Nelvana.com (archive)
 Webpage
 

2000s Canadian animated television series
2000 Canadian television series debuts
2000 Taiwanese television series debuts
2002 Canadian television series endings
2002 Taiwanese television series endings
Fictional characters with paraplegia
Canadian children's animated comedy television series
CBC Television original programming
Television shows set in San Francisco
Television series created by John Callahan
Television shows based on comics
Television series by Nelvana
Television shows about disability
English-language television shows
Nickelodeon original programming